A diagonal mirror is a flat mirror used to produce a right-angle bend in a light path.  Examples of diagonal mirrors include:
 The secondary mirror used in a Newtonian telescope
 The tertiary mirror used in a Nasmyth telescope
 A star diagonal right-angled telescope eyepiece mount
 An optical Edwardian parlour entertainment device also known as a Zograscope